Bela Vista (Portuguese for "Beautiful View") is a village in Lobata District on São Tomé Island in São Tomé and Príncipe. Its population is 527 (2012 census). It lies 0.8 km south of Santo Amaro and 5 km northwest of the capital city São Tomé.

Population history

References

Populated places in Lobata District